Vyacheslav Senchenko (born 12 April 1977) is a Ukrainian former professional boxer who competed from 2002 to 2015, and held the WBA welterweight title from 2009 to 2012.

Amateur career
Senchenko represented Ukraine at the 2000 Olympics in Sydney, competing in the light welterweight division and losing in the round of 16.

Professional career
Senchenko made his professional debut in July 2002 and by his fourth bout won the WBC CIS and Slovenian Boxing Bureau (CISBB) welterweight title, a title he defended against Dzmitri Kashkan February 2003 and that September against Russian Evgeny Ershov.

On April 8, 2004, Senchenko won the IBF Inter-Continental welterweight title, stopping Aliaksandr Shnip after just three rounds in Donetsk. He went on to defend four times in the next year and a half, with defeats of Bagaza Mwambene, Cesar Alberto Leiva, Arthur Nowak and French champion Brice Faradji.

At the start of 2006, Senchencko now unbeaten at 16-0 with 11 knockouts moved away from the Inter-Continental title and faced Kazakh, Assan Seksenbayev for the IBF International welterweight title. Senchenko once again emerged victorious in front of his home crowd in the Druzhba Arena in Donetsk. That September he defended at Druzhba once more with a TKO win over Stephane Benito. In November professionally fought outside of Eastern Europe for the first time, going to Monaco to defeat Italian Vincenzo Finzi on the undercard of a Roman Greenberg bout.

His high activity with Union Boxing Promotions continued. Just the next month he was back in Donetsk to fight for add the EBU-EE (European External European Union) welterweight title to his collection against Giorgi Ungiadze. Now somewhat of a permanent fixture at the Druzhba, Senchenko defended this title there four more times in 2007. The last of the year came against fellow Ukrainian Viktor Sydorenko, in a fight also for the WBA Inter-Continental welterweight title. Sydorenko's corner threw in the towel in the third, adding yet another second rate international title to Senchenkos repertoire.

In 2008 he would defend the WBA Inter-Continental welterweight title three more times at the Druzhba, with wins against Stuart Elwell, EBU champion Frederic Klose and Brazilian Adonisio Francisco Reges. After this success, the WBA ranked him 3rd in the world, putting him in path for a World Championship bout.

WBA welterweight champion 
In 2009 Senchenko finally got the chance to fight for a world title. On April 10, 2009 he would face fellow Ukrainian and WBA World champion Yuriy Nuzhnenko. This was a landmark bout, as for the first time in almost twenty years since paid boxing made its entrance into the former Soviet Union, two local fighters would clash against each other for the legitimate world championship in their Homeland. Both fighters went into the bout unbeaten and with 28 wins. In a hard fought bout Senchenko dominated on the judges cards and won by Unanimous decision after 12 rounds.

Professional boxing record

References

External links

1977 births
Living people
People from Kremenchuk
Ukrainian male boxers
World Boxing Association champions
World welterweight boxing champions
Light-welterweight boxers
Boxers at the 2000 Summer Olympics
Olympic boxers of Ukraine
Sportspeople from Poltava Oblast